Christopher Joseph Walker (10 July 1942 – 18 April 2017) was a British historian and author.

Life and career
Walker was educated at Lancing College and Brasenose College, Oxford.

He worked in Sotheby's department of historical and literary manuscripts. After winning a Winston Churchill Travelling Fellowship in 1971 he wrote a book on Armenian history which was reissued in 1990. In 1975 with the support of "Minority Rights Group" he published "The Armenians" report (co-author - prof. David Marshall Lang). In November 1989 at Oxford University Walker had a lecture on the modern history of Armenia. He also wrote several books and articles on the history of Armenia, including the book Armenia: The Survival of a Nation, which has been described as an "excellent history of Greater Armenia" and "a balanced presentation" of the events during the Armenian genocide of 1895-1918.

After a long-time research in archives, in 2003 Walker completed his book, Life of Oliver Baldwin, about a soldier, statesman, and journalist, the son of a Conservative Prime Minister, who became a Labour member of British Parliament.

Publications
The Armenians, by David Marshall Lang and Christopher J. Walker, London: Minority Rights Group, MRG Report No. 32, fifth edition, 1987
Armenia and Karabagh: The Struggle for Unity, 1991
Oliver Baldwin : A Life of Dissent, 2003
Visions of Ararat (writings on Armenia), 2005
 "At History's Crossroad: The making of the Armenian nation," (The Armenians: From Kings and Priests to Merchants and Commissars) (Book review) Weekly Standard Nov 27, 2006.
Friends or Foes? The Islamic East and the West, History Today, March 2007, Volume: 57, Issue: 3, Page 50-57

Sources
Caravans to Oblivion: The Armenian Genocide, by G. S. Graber, 1996, p. 29

References

External links
Biography
Books by Walker at OpenLibrary
The Armenians - A Minority Rights Group Report

British historians
1942 births
2017 deaths
Armenian studies scholars